Sacred Treasures: Choral Masterworks from Russia is the first release in the Hearts of Space Records series 'Sacred Treasures'.  The 1998 compilation album is composed of choral pieces from the Russian Orthodox Church.

Track listing

External links 
 [ Album page on allmusic.com]
 Album page on Hearts of Space Records’ website

1998 compilation albums
Hearts of Space Records albums
Christian music compilation albums
Choral music